3 Minute Movies is the third studio album by Australian singer-songwriter Angus Gill. It is a collaboration with the members of the Paul Kelly band, released under Angus Gill & Seasons of Change. It was released on 25 September 2020 both digitally and on CD. 3 Minute Movies reached #1 on the AIR Album Charts, #2 on the ARIA Australian Country Album Charts, #8 on the ARIA Australian Album Charts and #28 on the ARIA Top 50 Album Charts. Angus Gill & Seasons of Change were nominated for Group or Duo of the Year and Alt Country Album of the Year at the 49th Country Music Awards of Australia.

Critical reception

Phil Stafford of The Australian said the album "typifies its title with self-contained, radio-friendly tales of resetting, expressing identity and savouring the similarly indelible aftertaste of romance." Stafford praised Gill’s songwriting, "Gill's songcraft betrays a precocity that blooms" and backing from Paul Kelly's band "strikes a balance between sympathetic and stepping out."

Track listing

Personnel
Angus Gill – acoustic guitar, vocals, background vocals
Peter Luscombe – drums
Bill McDonald – bass
Cameron Bruce – piano, Fender Rhodes, Farfisa, Hammond organ
Ashley Naylor – electric guitar
Dan Kelly – electric guitar
Susie Ahern – background vocals
Jaron Mossman – percussion
Max Abrams – saxophones on “Acquainted With The Night”
Lorne McDougall – bagpipes on “Skin Story”
Mark Lizotte – acoustic and electric guitars, bass, mandolin, percussion, background vocals on “Daylight Robbery”

Production notes:
Angus Gill – producer, engineer
Lucas James – engineer
Jeff McCormack – mastering
Judy Nadin – album artwork
Dan Stanley-Freeman – design

Charts

References

2020 albums
Angus Gill albums